Pao Pao is an associated commune on the island of Moorea, in French Polynesia. It is part of the commune Moorea-Maiao. According to a census in 2007, it had a population of 4,244 people. According to the 2012 census, it had grown to a population 4,580 people. In the 2017 census, it had grown to a population of 4,639. It is the largest village in Moorea.

History
The Pao Pao area was first settled by travelers from Asia. They  built houses out of branches and hunted fish. When James Cook came to Moorea, he made contact with them and continued his journey. That is how Cook's Bay got its name.

Transport
Residents of Pao Pao often take the Moorea Airport to travel to other islands in French Polynesia. The nearby island of Tahiti is a 45-minute ferry ride from Moorea, which draws a fair amount of tourism to the area.

Geography

Pao Pao is located at the bottom of Cook's Bay on Moorea. It is surrounded by many mountains and flat land is limited.

Climate

Pao Pao has a tropical rainforest climate (Köppen climate classification Af).

Economy
Pao Pao is known for being the home to the Moorea Juice Factory, which offers tours on how the juice is made and sells juice in a nearby store. The Supermarché (which is supermarket in French) of Pao Pao is a major store in the village.

References

External links 

Populated places in the Society Islands
Mo'orea